Dinsmore Township is one of the fourteen townships of Shelby County, Ohio, United States.  The 2000 census found 3,357 people in the township, 1,371 of whom lived in the unincorporated portions of the township.

Geography
Located in the northern part of the county, it borders the following townships:
Pusheta Township, Auglaize County - north
Clay Township, Auglaize County - northeast corner
Jackson Township - east
Franklin Township - south
Van Buren Township - west
Washington Township, Auglaize County - northwest corner

Two villages are located in Dinsmore Township: part of Anna in the south, and Botkins in the north and center.

Name and history
Dinsmore Township was established in 1832. It is the only Dinsmore Township statewide.

Government
The township is governed by a three-member board of trustees, who are elected in November of odd-numbered years to a four-year term beginning on the following January 1. Two are elected in the year after the presidential election and one is elected in the year before it. There is also an elected township fiscal officer, who serves a four-year term beginning on April 1 of the year after the election, which is held in November of the year before the presidential election. Vacancies in the fiscal officership or on the board of trustees are filled by the remaining trustees.

References

External links
County website

Townships in Shelby County, Ohio
Townships in Ohio